Francis Ryan Duffy (June 23, 1888 – August 16, 1979) was a United States senator from Wisconsin, a United States circuit judge of the United States Court of Appeals for the Seventh Circuit and a United States district judge of the United States District Court for the Eastern District of Wisconsin.

Education and career

Born on June 23, 1888, in Fond du Lac, Fond du Lac County, Wisconsin, Duffy attended the public schools. He received a Bachelor of Arts degree in 1910 from the University of Wisconsin–Madison and a Bachelor of Laws in 1912 from the University of Wisconsin Law School and was admitted to the bar in 1912. He was in private practice of law in Fond du Lac from 1912 to 1917, from 1919 to 1933, and in 1939. He served in the United States Army during World War I from 1917 to 1919, attaining the rank of Major. He was United States Senator from Wisconsin from 1933 to 1939.

Congressional service

Duffy was elected as a Democrat to the United States Senate and served from March 4, 1933, to January 3, 1939. He served during the 73rd, 74th and 75th United States Congresses. He was an unsuccessful candidate for reelection in 1938. Following his departure from the Senate, he briefly resumed the private practice of law.

Federal judicial service

Duffy was nominated by President Franklin D. Roosevelt on June 21, 1939, to a seat on the United States District Court for the Eastern District of Wisconsin vacated by Judge Ferdinand August Geiger. He was confirmed by the United States Senate on June 26, 1939, and received his commission on June 29, 1939. His service terminated on February 2, 1949, due to his elevation to the Seventh Circuit.

Duffy was nominated by President Harry S. Truman on January 13, 1949, to a seat on the United States Court of Appeals for the Seventh Circuit vacated by Judge Evan Alfred Evans. He was confirmed by the Senate on January 31, 1949, and received his commission on February 2, 1949. He was sworn in on February 14, 1949. He served as Chief Judge and as a member of the Judicial Conference of the United States from 1954 to 1959. He assumed senior status on June 30, 1966. His service terminated upon his death.

Death

Duffy died on August 16, 1979, in Milwaukee, Wisconsin. He is interred at Calvary Cemetery in Fond du Lac.

References

Sources

External links
 

1888 births
1979 deaths
Catholics from Wisconsin
Wisconsin Democrats
Politicians from Fond du Lac, Wisconsin
Lawyers from Milwaukee
Judges of the United States District Court for the Eastern District of Wisconsin
United States district court judges appointed by Franklin D. Roosevelt
20th-century American judges
Judges of the United States Court of Appeals for the Seventh Circuit
United States court of appeals judges appointed by Harry S. Truman
University of Wisconsin–Madison alumni
University of Wisconsin Law School alumni
Democratic Party United States senators from Wisconsin
United States Army officers
United States Army personnel of World War I
Military personnel from Milwaukee
Politicians from Milwaukee